The 2022 NCAA Division I women's basketball tournament was a single-elimination tournament of 68 teams to determine the National Collegiate Athletic Association (NCAA) Division I college basketball national champion for the 2021–22 NCAA Division I women's basketball season. The 40th edition of the tournament began on March 16, 2022, and concluded with the championship game on April 3 at Target Center in Minneapolis, where the South Carolina Gamecocks defeated the UConn Huskies 64–49 to win their second NCAA title.

The tournament expanded from the 64-team field used from 1994 through 2021, to the 68-team format used in the men's tournament since 2011. 

Big South champion Longwood, Horizon champion IUPUI and Southland champion Incarnate Word made their tournament debuts. Tennessee continued its record streak of making  every edition of the tournament, while UConn extended its record streak of 14 consecutive Final Four appearances.

Tournament procedure

For the first time, the women's tournament was expanded from 64 to 68 teams, adopting the format that has been used by the men's tournament since 2011; these teams consisted of the 32 conference champions, and 36 "at-large" bids that were extended by the NCAA Selection Committee. The last four at-large teams and the teams seeded 65 through 68 overall competed in First Four games, whose winners advanced to the 64-team first round.

The top four teams outside of the ranking (commonly known as the "first four out" were designated as standbys in the event a school was forced to withdraw before the start of the tournament due to COVID-19 protocols. Once the tournament began, teams that withdrew would not be replaced, and the affected team's opponent would automatically advance to the next round by walkover.

2022 NCAA tournament schedule and venues 

After the 2020 tournament was cancelled and the 2021 tournament was held in a single location due to the COVID-19 pandemic, it was reverted to the standard format for the first time since 2019.

The first two rounds, also referred to as the subregionals, were played at the sites of the top 16 seeds, as was done from 2016 to 2019.

First Four
March 16 and 17
Four of the campuses seeded in the Top 16.

Subregionals (first and second rounds)
March 18 and 20 (Fri/Sun)
 Colonial Life Arena, Columbia, South Carolina (Host: University of South Carolina)
 James Hilton Coliseum, Ames, Iowa (Host: Iowa State University)
 Carver-Hawkeye Arena, Iowa City, Iowa (Host: University of Iowa)
 KFC Yum! Center, Louisville, Kentucky (Host: University of Louisville)
 Ferrell Center, Waco, Texas (Host: Baylor University)
 Maples Pavilion, Stanford, California (Host: Stanford University)
 XFINITY Center, College Park, Maryland (Host: University of Maryland)
 Frank Erwin Center, Austin, Texas (Host: University of Texas)
March 19 and 21 (Sat/Mon)
 McKale Center, Tucson, Arizona (Host: University of Arizona)
 Thompson-Boling Arena, Knoxville, Tennessee (Host: University of Tennessee)
 Crisler Center, Ann Arbor, Michigan (Host: University of Michigan)
 Pete Maravich Assembly Center, Baton Rouge, Louisiana (Host: Louisiana State University)
 Reynolds Coliseum, Raleigh, North Carolina (Host: North Carolina State University)
 Lloyd Noble Center, Norman, Oklahoma (Host: University of Oklahoma)
 Simon Skjodt Assembly Hall, Bloomington, Indiana (Host: Indiana University)
 Harry A. Gampel Pavilion, Storrs, Connecticut (Host: University of Connecticut)

Regional semifinals and finals (Sweet Sixteen and Elite Eight)
 March 25–28
Bridgeport regional, Total Mortgage Arena, Bridgeport, Connecticut (cohosts: University of Connecticut, Fairfield University)
Greensboro regional, Greensboro Coliseum Complex, Greensboro, North Carolina (host: Atlantic Coast Conference)
 Wichita regional, Intrust Bank Arena, Wichita, Kansas (host: Wichita State University)
 Spokane regional, Spokane Arena, Spokane, Washington (host: University of Idaho)

National semifinals and Championship (Final Four and Championship)
 April 1 and April 3
Target Center,  Minneapolis, Minnesota (host: University of Minnesota)

In the wake of criticism raised in 2021 over inequities between the men's and women's NCAA basketball tournaments, the NCAA announced that the 2022 women's tournament will be promoted with the "March Madness" branding for the first time.

Qualification and selection teams

Automatic qualifiers
The following teams automatically qualified for the 2022 NCAA field by virtue of winning their conference's tournament.

Bids by state 

<noinclude>

Tournament seeds (list by region)

*See First Four

Tournament bracket
All times are listed as Eastern Daylight Time (UTC−4)
* – Denotes overtime period

First Four

Greensboro regional – Greensboro, North Carolina

Greensboro regional final

Greensboro regional All Tournament team
 Aliyah Boston, South Carolina (MOP)
 Destanni Henderson, South Carolina
 Lauren Jensen, Creighton
 Emily Ryan, Iowa State
 Deja Kelly, North Carolina

Wichita regional – Wichita, Kansas

Wichita regional final

Wichita regional All Tournament team
 Hailey Van Lith, Louisville (MOP)
 Emily Engstler, Louisville
 Naz Hillmon, Michigan
 Hannah Sjerven, South Dakota
 Rae Burrell, Tennessee

Spokane regional – Spokane, Washington

Spokane regional final

Spokane regional All Tournament team
 Haley Jones, Stanford (MOP)
 Lexie Hull, Stanford
 Rori Harmon, Texas
 Cameron Brink, Stanford
 Joanne Allen-Taylor, Texas

Bridgeport regional – Bridgeport, Connecticut

Bridgeport regional final

Bridgeport regional All Tournament team
 Paige Bueckers, Connecticut (MOP)
 Christyn Williams, Connecticut
 Azzi Fudd, Connecticut
 Elissa Cunane, NC State
 Olivia Miles, Notre Dame

Final Four – Minneapolis, Minnesota

National semifinals

National championship

Final Four all-tournament team
 Haley Jones, Stanford
 Paige Bueckers, Connecticut
 Zia Cooke, South Carolina
 Destanni Henderson, South Carolina
 Aliyah Boston, South Carolina (MOP)

Record by conference

The FF, R64, R32, S16, E8, F4, CG, and NC columns indicate how many teams from each conference were in the first four, round of 64 (first round), round of 32 (second round), Sweet 16, Elite Eight, Final Four, championship game, and national champion, respectively.

Game summaries and tournament notes

Upsets

Greensboro
 No. 10 Creighton defeated No. 2 Iowa 64–62.
 No. 10 Creighton defeated No. 3 Iowa State 76–68.

Wichita
 No. 11 Villanova defeated No. 6 BYU 61–57.
 No. 12 Belmont defeated No. 5 Oregon 73–70 in double overtime.
 No. 10 South Dakota defeated No. 2 Baylor 61–47.

Spokane
 No. 12 Florida Gulf Coast defeated No. 5 Virginia Tech 84–81.

Bridgeport
 No. 11 Princeton defeated No. 6 Kentucky 69–62.

Media coverage

Television
ESPN served as the exclusive broadcaster of the tournament, with all games airing on either ESPN, ESPN2, ESPNU, ESPNews, or ABC. ESPN offered Megacast coverage for the Women's Final Four and championship game, including The Bird & Taurasi Show on ESPN2 (hosted by Sue Bird and Diana Taurasi, with similarities to ESPN's Monday Night Football with Payton and Eli), along with a feed featuring enhanced statistics and augmented reality graphics using player and ball tracking, and "Beyond the Rim" and "On the Rail" camera options on ESPN+.

Studio host and analysts
 Elle Duncan (Host) (First Four, First, Second rounds, Regionals, Final Four, and National championship game)
 Kelsey Riggs (Host) (First Four, First, and Second rounds)
 Rebecca Lobo (Analyst) (First Four, First, Second rounds, Final Four, and National championship game)
 Andraya Carter (Analyst) (First Four, First, and Second rounds)
 Nikki Fargas (Analyst) (First Four, First, Second rounds, Regionals, Final Four, and National championship game)
 Monica McNutt (Analyst) (First Four, First, Second rounds, and Regionals)
 Carolyn Peck (Analyst) (Final Four and National championship game)

Broadcast assignments

First Four
 Courtney Lyle & Carolyn Peck – Columbia, South Carolina
 Jenn Hildreth & Mike Thibault – Ames, Iowa
 Sam Ravech & Kelly Gramlich – Raleigh, North Carolina
 Brenda VanLengen & Holly Warlick – Baton Rouge, Louisiana
First & second rounds Friday/Sunday (Subregionals)
 Courtney Lyle & Carolyn Peck – Columbia, South Carolina
 Elise Woodward & Andrea Lloyd – Waco, Texas
 Beth Mowins & Christy Thomaskutty – Iowa City, Iowa
 Dave O'Brien & Christy Winters-Scott – College Park, Maryland
 John Brickley & Meghan McKeown – Louisville, Kentucky
 Angel Gray & Chelsea Gray – Austin, Texas
 Jenn Hildreth & Mike Thibault – Ames, Iowa
 Tiffany Greene & Steffi Sorensen – Stanford, California
First & second rounds Saturday/Monday (Subregionals)
 Sam Ravech & Kelly Gramlich – Raleigh, North Carolina
 Pam Ward & Stephanie White – Storrs, Connecticut
 Sam Gore & Aja Ellison – Ann Arbor, Michigan
 Brenda VanLengen & Holly Warlick – Baton Rouge, Louisiana
 Kevin Fitzgerald & Helen Williams – Bloomington, Indiana
 Eric Frede & Tamika Catchings – Knoxville, Tennessee
 Roy Philpott & Brooke Weisbrod – Norman, Oklahoma
 Ann Schatz & Dan Hughes – Tucson, Arizona

Regionals (Sweet 16 and Elite Eight)
 Ryan Ruocco, Rebecca Lobo, Holly Rowe & Andraya Carter – Bridgeport, Connecticut
 Beth Mowins, Debbie Antonelli & Angel Gray – Spokane, Washington 
 Courtney Lyle, Carolyn Peck & Steffi Sorensen – Greensboro, North Carolina 
 Pam Ward, Stephanie White & Christy Winters-Scott – Wichita, Kansas
Final Four and National Championship
 Ryan Ruocco, Rebecca Lobo, Holly Rowe & Andraya Carter – Minneapolis, Minnesota

Radio
Westwood One had exclusive radio rights to the entire tournament.

Regionals
 Matt Chazanow & Krista Blunk – Spokane, Washington
 Sam Neidermann & Ali Jaques – Greensboro, North Carolina
 Lance Medow & Kim Adams – Bridgeport, Connecticut
 Phil Constantino & Kristen Kozlowski – Wichita, Kansas
Final Four and Championship
 Ryan Radtke, Debbie Antonelli & Krista Blunk – Minneapolis, Minnesota

See also 
 2022 Women's National Invitation Tournament
 2022 Women's Basketball Invitational
 2022 NCAA Division II women's basketball tournament
 2022 NCAA Division III women's basketball tournament
 2022 NCAA Division I men's basketball tournament

References

External links 
 NCAA Women's Basketball Division I

NCAA Division I women's basketball tournament
NCAA Division I women's basketball tournament
NCAA Division I women's basketball tournament
NCAA Division I women's basketball tournament
NCAA Division I women's basketball tournament
2021–22 NCAA Division I women's basketball season